The 2001 Winston-Salem mayoral election was held on November 6, 2001 to elect the mayor of Winston-Salem, North Carolina. It saw the election of Allen Joines, who defeated incumbent mayor Jack Canvanagh.

Primaries
The date of the primaries was September 25, 2001.

Democratic primary

Republican primary

General election

References 

Winston-Salem
Mayoral elections in Winston-Salem, North Carolina
Winston-Salem